Kim Woo-jin (born 1997) is a South Korean singer.

Kim Woo-jin may also refer to:

 Kim Woo-jin (archer) (born 1992), South Korean archer
 Kim U-jin, North Korean politician, member of the 4th Supreme People's Assembly (1967–1972)
 Kim U-jin (1897–1926), Korean playwright